Knights in White Satin is a 1976 album composed, produced and performed by Giorgio Moroder.

Side A of the album is a continuous three part suite, consisting of a disco version of the Moody Blues' 1967 hit "Nights in White Satin", with a Moroder/Bellotte composition called "In the Middle of the Knight" acting as the second (middle) section. The composition is typical of the disco era in that it covers an entire LP side, but atypical as it is quite slow, only 110bpm, and not what was usually considered the standard at the time, 120bpm.

The primary bass line figure used in the "Knights in White Satin" track was re-used, at a faster tempo and with additional delay effects, in Chase, recorded for Moroder's 1978 soundtrack of Alan Parker's film, Midnight Express.

Track listing

Side 1
"Knights in White Satin" (Justin Hayward) - 4:48
"In the Middle of the Knight" (Giorgio Moroder, Pete Bellotte) - 5:15
"Knights in White Satin" (Justin Hayward) - 5:06

Side 2
"Oh, l'amour"  (Giorgio Moroder, Pete Bellotte) - 5:45
"Sooner or Later"  (Giorgio Moroder, Pete Bellotte) - 5:36
"I Wanna Funk with You Tonite" (Giorgio Moroder, Pete Bellotte) - 5:24

2011 CD Bonus Tracks
"Let The Music Play" (Single Version) - 3:39
"Oh L'Amour" (Single Version) - 5:20
"I Wanna Funk With You Tonite" (Single Version) - 3:54
"Knights In White Satin" (Single Version) - 3:52

Charts

References

Giorgio Moroder albums
1976 albums
Albums produced by Giorgio Moroder